The following lists events that happened during 2016 in Burkina Faso.

Incumbents
President: Roch Marc Christian Kaboré
Prime Minister: Paul Kaba Thieba and Christophe Joseph Marie Dabiré

Events

January
 15 January – Burkina Faso security forces stormed the Hotel Splendid which had been under attack by Al Qaeda in the Islamic Maghreb militants, amongst other places.

References

 
2010s in Burkina Faso
Burkina Faso
Burkina Faso
Years of the 21st century in Burkina Faso